Josef Stürmann (1906–1959) was a Munich philosopher who had studied with the phenomenologist Alexander Pfänder.

Stürmann was also a member of the Christian Social Union of Bavaria.

References 

1906 births
1959 deaths
Writers from Munich
20th-century German philosophers
Christian Social Union in Bavaria politicians
German male writers